Camtel is a national telecommunications and Internet service provider in Cameroon.  The company is busy building its network, including: Access to a CDMA (Code Division Multiple Access) network; digitization of the country's telephone exchanges; and optical fiber along the highway between Douala and Yaoundé, and between Kribi and Lolodorf.

There are 47 telephone exchanges in the company's system.  There are about 150,000 telephone lines in its cable network and its switching network.  Camtel operates three satellite-to-earth stations: Bepanda, Zamengoe and Garoua.

External links
CAMTEL - English language

Telecommunications companies of Cameroon